Ximeniconus is subgenus of sea snails, marine gastropod mollusks in the genus Conasprella,  family Conidae, the cone snails and their allies.

In the new classification of the family Conidae by Puillandre N., Duda T.F., Meyer C., Olivera B.M. & Bouchet P. (2015), Ximeniconus has become a subgenus of Conasprella: Conasprella (Ximeniconus) Emerson & Old, 1962  represented as Conasprella Thiele, 1929

Species
 Ximeniconus gubernatrix Petuch & Berschauer, 2018 : synonym of Conasprella (Ximeniconus) gubernatrix (Petuch & Berschauer, 2018) represented as Conasprella gubernatrix (Petuch & Berschauer, 2018) (original combination)
 Ximeniconus mahogani (Reeve, 1843) represented as Conasprella mahogani (Reeve, 1843) (alternate representation)
 Ximeniconus ximenes (Gray, 1839): synonym of  Conasprella ximenes Gray, 1839

References

External links
 

Conidae
Gastropod subgenera